In the 1967–68 season of Atlantic Coast Conference men's basketball, the North Carolina Tar Heels team finished in the top position. The same team won the ACC Championship, and got through to the finals of the NCAA tournament, losing to UCLA.

Final standings

ACC tournament
See 1968 ACC men's basketball tournament

NCAA tournament

Regional semifinal
North Carolina 91, St Bonaventure 72

Regional final
North Carolina 70, Davidson 66

National semifinal
North Carolina 80, Ohio State 66

National final
UCLA 78, North Carolina 55

ACC's NCAA record
3-1

NIT

First round
Duke 97, Oklahoma City 81

Quarterfinals
Saint Peter's 100, Duke 71

External links
 Info at Sports-Reference.com